Sabina Moya Rivas (born January 27, 1977 in Turbo, Antioquia) is a retired female javelin thrower from Colombia.

Career
She set her personal best (62.62 metres) on May 12, 2002 in Guatemala City.

Achievements

References

External links

sports-reference

1977 births
Living people
Athletes (track and field) at the 2000 Summer Olympics
Athletes (track and field) at the 1999 Pan American Games
Athletes (track and field) at the 2003 Pan American Games
Olympic athletes of Colombia
Sportspeople from Antioquia Department
Pan American Games competitors for Colombia
Colombian female javelin throwers
South American Games gold medalists for Colombia
South American Games medalists in athletics
Competitors at the 1998 South American Games
Central American and Caribbean Games silver medalists for Colombia
Competitors at the 2002 Central American and Caribbean Games
Central American and Caribbean Games medalists in athletics
20th-century Colombian women
21st-century Colombian women